Sarıhasan is a village of Mecitözü District in Çorum Province, Turkey. Its population is 264 (2022). It is 45 km from Çorum and 9 km from Mecitözü.

Population

References 

Villages in Mecitözü District